Literary Arts may refer to:

Creative writing or literature
Literary Arts, Inc., an American arts organization that presents the annual Oregon Book Awards